Radiant is a sans-serif typeface designed by R. Hunter Middleton for the Ludlow Typograph company. Radiant is a "stressed" or "modulated" sans-serif, in which there is a clear difference between the weight of vertical and horizontal strokes. It is intended particularly for display and non-body-text use, such as in advertising.

Radiant has been digitised in several versions.

References

External links
 Fonts in Use
 Ludlow specimen book

Letterpress typefaces
Sans-serif typefaces
Display typefaces
Typefaces designed by R. Hunter Middleton